Sasidharan is a 1950 Indian Malayalam-language film, directed by T Janaki Ram and produced by Swami Narayanan. The film stars Nagavally R. S. Kurup, N. P. Chellappan Nair and Miss Kumari in lead roles. The film had musical score by P. Kalinga Rao. It is the first Malayalam film adaptation of a popular stage play. It is debut Malayalam film of P. Kalinga Rao, T. Janakiram, Aranmula Ponnamma, S. P. Pillai, N. P. Chellappan Nair, Kaviyoor Revamma, P. Mohankumari, and lyricist Thumpamon Padmanabhankutty.

Cast
 Kottarakkara Sreedharan Nair as Rajasekharan
 Miss Kumari as Vilasini
 Nagavally R. S. Kurup as Kumar
 N. P. Chellappan Nair as Editor
 Kaviyoor CK Revamma as Kamalam
 S. P. Pillai as Maniyan
 PK Kamalakshi as Janu
 R Kumaran Bhagavathar as Sivaram
 KK Padmanabhankutty Asan as Panicker
 T. R. Omana as Indubala
 Ambalappuzha Krishnamoorthy as Sekharan
 E Kuttiyamma Bhagavathar as Meenu
 Vaikkam Mani as Madhu
 Aranmula Ponnamma as Kalyaniyamma
 PK Vikraman Nair as Sasidharan

References

External links
 

1950 films
1950s Malayalam-language films